The Thomas Marshall House is a historic house in Dayton, Armstrong County, Pennsylvania. It was listed on the National Register of Historic Places on April 22, 1976.

History 
The house was built around 1865–1868 with a Georgian plan.  The architecture mixes general Victorian themes with elements of the earlier Greek Revival in a vernacular manner. An addition was added to the house in 1881.

As of 2013, it is home to the Dayton Area Local History Society, and is open for tours by appointment. It was restored by the Dayton Area Bicentennial Committee, which opened it in July 1976.

See also 
 National Register of Historic Places listings in Armstrong County, Pennsylvania

References 

Houses on the National Register of Historic Places in Pennsylvania
Houses completed in 1865
Georgian architecture in Pennsylvania
Greek Revival houses in Pennsylvania
Victorian architecture in Pennsylvania
Houses in Armstrong County, Pennsylvania
1976 in Pennsylvania
National Register of Historic Places in Armstrong County, Pennsylvania